Banas Medical College and Research Institute, Palanpur is a medical college located in Palanpur, Gujarat. It was established in the year 2018. The college imparts the degree Bachelor of Medicine and Surgery (MBBS). Nursing and para-medical courses are also offered. The college is affiliated to Hemchandracharya North Gujarat University and is recognised by Medical Council of India. The hospital associated with the college is one of the largest hospitals in the Palanpur. The selection to the college is done on the basis of merit through National Eligibility and Entrance Test. Yearly undergraduate student intake is 200.

Courses
Banas Medical College and Research Institute, Palanpur undertakes education and training of students MBBS courses. This college is offering 200 MBBS seats from 2019 of which 85% Seats are of state quota and 15% is for NRI/Management quota.

References

External links 
 http://www.bmcri.co.in/

2017 establishments in Gujarat
Educational institutions established in 2017
Medical colleges in Gujarat